The Agglomeration community of Pays d'Aubagne et de l'Étoile is a former intercommunal structure joining the communes near Aubagne in the Bouches-du-Rhône and Var departments in the Provence-Alpes-Côte d'Azur region of Southeastern France. It was created in December 1999. On 1 January 2016 it became a territory in the Aix-Marseille-Provence Metropolis.

Origins
It was formed 1 January 2007 after the dissolution of the Communauté de communes de l'Étoile-Merlançon and the five associated communes joined the Agglomeration community of Garlaban-Huveaune-Sainte-Baume forming the new Agglomeration community of Pays d'Aubagne et de l'Étoile.

Communes
Twelve communes belonged to this agglomeration community, eleven within the Bouches-du-Rhône and one in the Var:
 Bouches-du-Rhône:
 Aubagne
 Auriol
 Belcodène
 Cadolive
 Cuges-les-Pins
 La Bouilladisse
 La Destrousse
 La Penne-sur-Huveaune
 Peypin
 Roquevaire
 Saint-Savournin
 one commune from the department of Var:
 Saint-Zacharie

Skills
The local powers of the agglomeration are:
 Economic development,
 Tourism
 Transport network with the free Bus de l'Agglo
 Urban planning,
 Housing and public facilities,
 Waste disposal and sanitation
 Agriculture and forestry.

Introduction
The country around Aubagne has many industries and commercial areas. It is mainly located in a tourist region of Provence, in the heart of a triangle formed by Marseille, Aix-en-Provence and Toulon.

The hills of Pagnol and the landscapes of Cézanne depict the hectic daily life of its inhabitants, while in the vicinity are other magnificent sites such as the Calanques or inlets from Marseille to La Ciotat through Cassis, and the Sainte-Baume mountain range.

Budget and Taxation
 Total operating revenues: €66,835,000 or €641 per capita
 Total capital resources: €22,867,000, or €219 per capita
 Debt: €13,607,000 or €131 per capita.

The Guérini Affair
On 14 January 2011, Alain Belviso, the elected PCF and president of the communauté d'agglomération du pays d'Aubagne et de l'Étoile, was indicted for embezzlement of public funds. He was the first elected official implicated in this case. He was released on bail under judicial control, then he resigned his office of alderman in February 2011 and left his position as president of the agglomeration.

References

External links
 Official Website of the Communauté d'agglomération du pays d'Aubagne et de l'Étoile 

Pays d'Aubagne et de l'Etoile
Former intercommunalities of Bouches-du-Rhône